Pitcairnia brittoniana is a plant species in the genus Pitcairnia. This species is native to Bolivia, Costa Rica, Venezuela and Ecuador.

References

brittoniana
Flora of Bolivia
Flora of Costa Rica
Flora of Venezuela
Flora of Ecuador